The 1920 Haiyuan earthquake occurred on December 16 in Haiyuan County, Ningxia Province, Republic of China at 19:05:53. It was also called the 1920 Gansu earthquake because Ningxia was a part of Gansu Province when the earthquake occurred. It caused destruction in the Lijunbu-Haiyuan-Ganyanchi area and was assigned the maximum intensity on the Mercalli intensity scale (XII Extreme). About 258,707~273,407 died, making it one of the most fatal earthquakes in China, in turn making it one of the worst disasters in China by death toll.

Earthquake
The earthquake hit at 19:05:53 Gansu-Sichuan time (12:05:53 UTC), reportedly 8.25  or 7.8 ML, and was followed by a series of aftershocks for three years.

Damage
Over 73,000 people were killed in Haiyuan County. A landslide buried the village of Sujiahe in Xiji County. More than 30,000 people were killed in Guyuan County. Nearly all the houses collapsed in the cities of Longde and Huining. Damage (VI–X) occurred in seven provinces and regions, including the major cities of Lanzhou, Taiyuan, Xi'an, Xining and Yinchuan. It was felt from the Yellow Sea to Qinghai (Tsinghai) Province and from Nei Mongol (Inner Mongolia) south to central Sichuan Province.

Casualties
Since 2003, Chinese seismologists has calculated 258,707~273,407 to be the empirical verifiable range of death toll. Older sources put the deaths to be 234,117 or 235,502. Either way, it is one of the most fatal earthquakes in China, in turn making it one of the worst disasters in China by death toll.

Many more perished because of cold: frequent aftershocks caused the survivors to fear building anything other than temporary shelters, and a severe winter killed many who had lived through the original earthquake. 

The Sufi Jahriyya Muslim Hui leader Ma Yuanzhang and his son died in the earthquake when the roof of the Mosque they were in collapsed in Zhangjiachuan.

Ground effects
About  of surface faulting was seen from Lijunbu through Ganyanchi to Jingtai. There were over 50,000 landslides in the epicentral area and ground cracking was widespread. Some rivers were dammed; others changed course. Seiches from this earthquake were observed in two lakes and three fjords in western Norway.

Aftermath
The Muslim General Ma Fuxiang was involved in relief efforts in Lanzhou during the earthquake.

See also
 List of disasters in China by death toll
 List of earthquakes in China
 List of earthquakes in 1920

References

Further reading

External links

Earthquakes in Gansu
Haiyuan Earthquake, 1920
Haiyuan Earthquake, 1920
History of Ningxia
Geography of Ningxia
Landslides in China
1920 disasters in China